In This Korner is a live album by drummer Art Blakey and the Jazz Messengers recorded at the Keystone Korner in San Francisco in 1978 and released on the Concord Jazz label.

Reception

Allmusic awarded the album 3 stars stating that "Although one of the lesser-known editions of The Jazz Messengers, the sextet featured on this Concord session could hold its own with its more acclaimed predecessors and successors".

Track listing 
All compositions by James Williams except where noted.
 Art Blakey Intro - 1:17  
 "Pamela" (Bobby Watson) - 9:31  
 "Unlimited" - 6:36  
 "In This Korner" - 7:47  
 "The Song Is You" (Oscar Hammerstein II, Jerome Kern) - 7:28  
 "Dark Side, Light Side" (George Cables) - 10:11  
 "1977 A.D." - 10:19 Bonus track on CD
 "Blue for Two" (Valery Ponomarev) - 7:33

Personnel 
Art Blakey - drums
Valery Ponomarev - trumpet
Bobby Watson - alto saxophone
David Schnitter - tenor saxophone
James Williams - piano
Dennis Irwin - bass

References 

Art Blakey live albums
The Jazz Messengers live albums
1978 live albums
Concord Records live albums
Music of the San Francisco Bay Area
Albums recorded at Keystone Korner